Hazel Poa Koon Koon (born 27 August 1970) is a Singaporean politician and businesswoman. A member of the opposition Progress Singapore Party (PSP), she has been a Non-Constituency Member of the 14th Parliament of Singapore since 2020.

Poa was a member of the Reform Party before joining the National Solidarity Party (NSP) in 2011. From June 2011 to September 2013, she served as the NSP's Secretary-General, before stepping down due to health concerns. In June 2015, following the resignation of Tan Lam Siong, the NSP appointed Poa as Acting Secretary-General, however she resigned from the party in August 2015 following a disagreement with the party's Central Executive Committee.

Biography 
Poa attended University of Cambridge on a scholarship from Singapore's Public Service Commission (PSC) and completed a degree in Mathematics with first class honours. She met her future husband, Tony Tan Lay Thiam, while they were both students at Cambridge. Upon completing her degree, Poa returned to serve in the Singapore Civil Service and was appointed to the Administrative Service. She was first posted to the Prime Minister's Office, where she served in the Public Service Division and was involved in personnel policies within the civil service. She then moved to the Ministry of Finance, where she was the Assistant Director for Indirect Taxation.

After four years, Poa left the civil service and joined the investment department of an insurance company, where she worked as an analyst. She later worked as an assistant fund manager before starting her own business.

Poa and her husband run a private school in Singapore and a chain of education centres in Singapore and Indonesia.

Political career 
Poa and her husband first joined the Reform Party in 2009 ahead of the 2011 general election and were slated to stand as candidates for the party in the election. However they were among six members of the party who resigned in February 2011 citing differences of opinion with the party's leaders.

Poa and Tan then joined the National Solidarity Party. In the 2011 general election, Poa and Tan were members of the party's five-person team which stood in the Chua Chu Kang Group Representation Constituency. The NSP's team lost to the team from the governing People's Action Party (PAP) by 56,885 votes (38.8%) to 89,710 (61.2%). As a husband and wife pair of former government scholars standing for an opposition party, Tan and Poa drew notable media attention during the election campaign.

In June 2011, Poa was elected as the Secretary-General of the NSP by the majority of the Central Executive Council following the resignation of Goh Meng Seng. She was the first woman to be elected Secretary-General of the NSP (and the second woman to occupy one of the highest positions in political parties in Singapore after Sylvia Lim of the Workers' Party). Poa resigned as Secretary-General in September 2013 citing health problems.

In June 2015, nearly two years after she resigned, Poa was appointed the Acting Secretary-General of the NSP following the resignation of Tan Lam Siong. The party decided against calling a Party Congress to elect a new Secretary-General "in view of the need to focus on preparations for the next general election". (Tan Lam Siong served in the post for only five months. His predecessor, Jeannette Chong-Aruldoss, had replaced Poa in October 2013 after Poa stepped down.) However, in August 2015, Poa announced that she was stepping down as Acting Secretary-General and leaving the party because she disagreed with the decision of the party's Central Executive Committee to field a candidate in the single-member constituency of MacPherson in the 2015 general election even though the Workers' Party was also planning to contest the PAP in the constituency. A week later, Poa was seen helping out with Singapore Democratic Party team in their walkabout at Bukit Timah Market and Food Centre on 30 August. Poa clarified in an interview in 2020, that although she had helped out at SDP events, she never joined the party.

In July 2019, Poa, along with another former SDP member Michelle Lee Juen, was seen as one of the CEC members of the newly established Progress Singapore Party.

Poa along with a team of candidates from PSP contested in the 2020 Singaporean general election, challenging the incumbent People's Action Party team at West Coast Group Representation Constituency (GRC), but had failed to garner a majority. However, as the Parliament of Singapore required a total of 12 opposition members, and with Workers' Party having won 10 seats, as the best performing defeated team, 2 Non-constituency Member of Parliament (NCMP) seats could be offered to Poa's team. PSP announced that they had chosen Poa and Leong Mun Wai for the NCMP seats after deliberations. The Returning Officer of the general election, Tan Meng Dui, declared them to be NCMPs with effect from 16 July 2020. On July 20, 2020, Poa stepped down as vice-chairman of PSP to focus on her NCMP duties. She took over as Parliament Secretariat since 4 August 2020 with Leong Mun Wai.

Personal life 
Poa is married to Tony Tan Lay Thiam and they have two adopted sons.

References

External links

 Hazel Poa on Parliament of Singapore
 

Progress Singapore Party politicians
Singapore Democratic Party politicians
National Solidarity Party (Singapore) politicians
Reform Party (Singapore) politicians
Singaporean women in politics
Singaporean politicians of Chinese descent
Alumni of the University of Cambridge
Hwa Chong Junior College alumni
CHIJ Saint Nicholas Girls' School alumni
1970 births
Living people
Singaporean Non-constituency Members of Parliament